Inferno Crater Lake is a large hot spring located in the Waimangu Volcanic Rift Valley on the North Island of New Zealand, and the largest geyser-like feature in the world. The actual geyser is not visible, as it plays underwater at the bottom of the lake, however, fumaroles are visible on the lake's shore and the rock wall behind it.

White silica deposits grow up to the overflow level, and the lake's colour is a result of finely divided silica suspended in the water. At low water levels the lake can be a dull grey colour, changing to an intensely sky blue colour at higher lake levels, in particular after the overflow stage.

Inferno Crater was blasted out of the side of the locally prominent Mt Haszard as part of the 1886 Mount Tarawera eruption, which opened several craters along a  rift stretching southwest from Mount Tarawera to the nearby Southern Crater.

Since 1901 the lake occupying Inferno Crater has exhibited water-level variations closely associated with the Waimangu Geyser cycle. Inferno Crater Lake and its neighbouring Frying Pan Lake form a unique relationship and follow an interconnected rhythmic cycle of hydrology variations repeating itself over the course of roughly 38 days. When the water level and temperature of Inferno Crater Lake increase, the water level and outflow of Frying Pan Lake decrease. Comparable cyclic activity is unknown in other hydrothermal systems in the world.

The system has been the subject of studies since monitoring equipment was installed in the area in 1970. Four distinct phases can be recognised in its cycle: First, the lake level rises steadily from its lowest level by a total of almost  over the course of eight days, and then it commences oscillating. The average lake level keeps rising over the course of the oscillations of the second phase until it reaches overflow level.
Next, the lake overflows for about 51 hours at a rate of almost , discharging on average  of over  hot water down a temporary overflow stream into Waimangu Stream in the valley below. The last stage sees the lake recede to its low level over the last 13 days of the cycle, its water temperature also falling to the low point.

Inferno Crater Lake is accessible via a side track with 50 steps off the main Waimangu walking track. It is one of three lakes filling craters created in the vicinity during the 1886 event.

References

Rotorua Lakes District
Hot springs of New Zealand
Okataina Volcanic Centre
Landforms of the Bay of Plenty Region